Joan Mary Koudelka (born 14 March 1948) is a South African former professional tennis player. She originally competed under her maiden name Joan Wilshere, before marrying Czech tennis player Štěpán Koudelka.

Koudelka had a win over her countrywoman Brenda Kirk to make the second round of the 1969 Wimbledon Championships. She qualified for her only French Open main draw in 1971 and was beaten in the first round by Evonne Goolagong, who went on to win the title.

References

External links
 
 

1948 births
Living people
South African female tennis players